The 2015–16 FA Vase Final was the 42nd final of the Football Association's cup competition for teams at levels 9–11 of the English football league system. The match was contested between Hereford F.C. of the Midland Football League Premier Division (level 9) and Morpeth Town AFC of the Northern Football League Division One (level 9). For the first time ever the final of the FA Trophy was played on the same day at the same venue. Both matches were televised in the UK on BT Sport.

Morpeth Town AFC won the game 4–1.

Match

Details

References

FA Vase Finals
FA Vase Final
FA Vase Final
FA Vase Final
Events at Wembley Stadium
FA Vase Final 2016
Morpeth Town A.F.C.